Rhos Dirion is a top of Waun Fach in the Black Mountains in south-eastern Wales. It is the highest point on the Rhos Dirion - Chwarel y Fan ridge.

The summit is marked by a trig point and crowns an area of peat bog, heather and long grasses. Its northern face is precipitous.

References

External links
 www.geograph.co.uk : photos of Waun Fach and surrounding area

Hewitts of Wales
Nuttalls
Mountains and hills of Powys
Black Mountains, Wales
Talgarth